The Ibias is a river in northern Spain flowing from the Autonomous Community of Asturias into Galicia.

See also
 Rivers of Galicia

Rivers of Spain
Rivers of Asturias
Rivers of Galicia (Spain)